Minier may refer to:

 Minier, French surname
 Minier, Illinois, United States
 Saint-Laurent-le-Minier, Gard, France